Good Luck de Fort-de-France is a football club of Martinique, playing in the town of Fort-de-France.

They play in the Martinique's first division, the Martinique Championnat National.

Achievements
Martinique Championnat National:
 1945, 1957

Coupe de la Martinique: 4
 1956, 1973, 1974, 1979

Coupe de France
Coupe de France: 1 appearance
1978–79

External links
 2007/2008 Club info at Antilles-Foot

Football clubs in Martinique